Lucas Brumme (born 25 September 1999) is a German professional footballer who plays as a midfielder for Wehen Wiesbaden.

Career
Brumme made his professional debut for Wehen Wiesbaden in the 3. Liga on 9 January 2021, starting in the home match against Hallescher FC. He was substituted out in the 68th minute for Benedict Hollerbach, with the match finishing as a 1–1 draw.

References

External links
 
 
 
 BFC Dynamo II statistics at Fussball.de

1999 births
Living people
German footballers
Association football midfielders
Berliner FC Dynamo players
SV Wehen Wiesbaden players
3. Liga players
Regionalliga players